Al Rida Airways was an airline based in Mauritania.

See also		
 List of defunct airlines of Mauritania

External links
Airlines Codes Website entry for Al Rida Airways

Defunct airlines of Mauritania